The 2007 Spengler Cup was held in Davos, Switzerland from December 26 to December 31, 2007.  All matches were played at host HC Davos's home Vaillant Arena. The final was won 2-1 by Team Canada over Salavat Yulaev Ufa.

Teams participating
 Team Canada
 HC Davos (host)
 Adler Mannheim
 HC Möller Pardubice
 Salavat Yulaev Ufa

Tournament

Round-Robin results

All times local (CET/UTC +1)

Finals

External links
Spenglercup.ch

2007–08
2007–08 in Swiss ice hockey
2007–08 in Czech ice hockey
2007–08 in Canadian ice hockey
2007–08 in German ice hockey
2007–08 in Russian ice hockey
December 2007 sports events in Europe